Air Ivoire was an airline headquartered in the Immueble EECI in Abidjan, Côte d'Ivoire. It was the national airline and operated scheduled regional and intercontinental services. Its main base was Port Bouet Airport, Abidjan. The airline ceased operations in 2011.

History 
The airline was established on 14 December 1960 and started operations in August 1964. Sodetraf, UTA and Air Afrique held an interest in the airline until January 1976, when the government of Côte d'Ivoire acquired all of the shares. Initially known as Air Ivoire, the airline suspended operations in September 1999 due to financial difficulties. After being acquired by AAA, owned 51% by Air France and AIG, the company changed its name to Nouvelle Air Ivoire and resumed operations in 2001. The airline had since reverted to its original title.

According to the company website, after an increase in the airline's company, and a repurchase by the government, Air Ivoire reverted to government control.  On 15 October 2008, the private Groupe Atlantique took a 51% shareholding, with the Government of Côte d'Ivoire retaining 49%.

Air Ivoire finalized a substantial fleet modernization process in the second half of 2009, whereby its Fokker F28 were replaced by three Boeing 737s forming the backbone of its regional network.  All aircraft were maintained as per Ivorian and European standards (EU-OPS).

Destinations

Fleet

The Air Ivoire fleet included the following aircraft (as of August 2012):

1 Airbus A321
4 Boeing 737-500

Historic fleet
 Airbus A319
 Boeing 737-200
 Boeing 737-300
 Fairchild Swearingen Metroliner
 Fokker 100
 Fokker F27 Friendship
 Fokker F28 Fellowship
 Douglas C-47
 NAMC YS-11A-614
 Short 360

See also		
 List of defunct airlines of Côte d'Ivoire

References

External links

Companies based in Abidjan
Defunct airlines of Ivory Coast
Airlines established in 1960
Government-owned airlines
Airlines disestablished in 2011
2011 disestablishments in Ivory Coast
Ivorian companies established in 1960